Chirala railway station (station code:CLX) is located at Chirala town of Bapatla district, in the Indian state of Andhra Pradesh. It is administered under Vijayawada railway division of South Coast Railway zone (formerly South Central Railway zone).

Classification 
In terms of earnings and outward passengers handled, Chirala is categorized as a Non-Suburban Grade-4 (NSG-4) railway station. Based on the re–categorization of Indian Railway stations for the period of 2017–18 and 2022–23, an NSG–4 category station earns between – crore and handles  passengers.

Station amenities 
It is one of the 38 stations in the division to be equipped with Automatic Ticket Vending Machines (ATVMs).

References 

Vijayawada railway division
Railway stations in Prakasam district